Nari-Koyu is one of the 60 Legislative Assembly constituencies of Arunachal Pradesh state in India. It is in Lower Siang district and is reserved for candidates belonging to the Scheduled Tribes.

Member of Legislative Assembly

Election results

2019

See also
List of constituencies of Arunachal Pradesh Legislative Assembly
Lower Siang district

References

Lower Siang district
Assembly constituencies of Arunachal Pradesh